Surapratap Shah or Surya Pratap Shah was a prince of the Gorkha Kingdom. He was active during the Unification of Nepal led by his brother, King Prithvi Narayan Shah.

He participated in the Battle of Kirtipur and the Battle of Makwanpur. He command the Battle of Kirtipur, in the battle, he lost his left eye, which led people to call him "a blind man".

Shah also held the title of Kaji. In the early 1970s, Shah went into exile in the Tanahun Kingdom, after Prithvi Narayan Shah and Surpratap had quarreled. This led to Prithvi Narayan Shah invading Tanahun.

Kirtipur War Memorial Park, an under-construction park, is set to depict the Battle of Kirtipur, and it is planned to show Surpratap Shah being struck by an arrow.

References 

18th-century Nepalese nobility
18th-century Nepalese people
Nepalese exiles
Nepalese Hindus
Nepalese princes
People from Gorkha District
People of the Nepalese unification